Threewave Software, Inc was a videogame developer based in Vancouver, British Columbia, Canada. They are best known for the development of Threewave CTF.

The company has taken on contract work for companies such as Activision, EA, Valve and LucasArts.

They are licensed to develop using the Source engine, id Tech, Unreal Engine, and the Infernal Engine.

The Studio's Executive Team consists of Dan Irish, CEO.

References

External links
Homepage

Defunct video game companies of Canada
Companies based in Vancouver
Canadian companies established in 1994
Privately held companies of Canada